The GWR petrol-electric railcar was a 4-wheel motorised coach purchased by the GWR in 1911 from British Thomson-Houston, who designed it and supplied the electrical fittings. It was powered by a  Maudslay petrol engine driving a dynamo which supplied two electric motors, one on each axle. It was numbered 100.

It was in use on the GWR until October 1919, when it was sold to Lever Brothers, who ran it at Port Sunlight until 1923.

References

 petrol-electric railcar
Railway locomotives introduced in 1911
Scrapped locomotives
Unique locomotives